Miss Stone (Macedonian: Мис Стоун) is a 1958 Yugoslav historical film, directed by Živorad Mitroviḱ. It tells the story about the Miss Stone Affair.

Synopsis
The film is set in 1901, and is based on events surrounding the growing Macedonian resistance to the Ottoman Empire. Resistance groups known as "Komiti" show the readiness of the Macedonian people to fight for freedom. At the same time different religious missions are trying to expand their influence among the people. Thessaloniki is the center of the American Protestant mission in Macedonia. The Internal Macedonian Revolutionary Organization abducted U.S. Protestant missionary Miss Stone (Olga Spiridonovikj) led by Yane Sandanski (Ilija Milcin) and his unit. The group demanded 25 pounds of gold to release her. They wanted her to sign the demand. She flatly refuses, but after going through several battles with Turkish forces, she stands on the side of guerrillas and signs the letter. The gold is eventually provided.

References 

 Macedonian Cinema Information (MKD)

External links
 

1958 films
Films directed by Zhivorad Mitrovik
Films based on actual events
1950s historical films
Yugoslav historical films
Macedonian-language films